Coles Notes are student guides to literature, published in Canada. The Coles bookstore first published Coles Notes in 1948. The first title published was on the French novella Colomba by Prosper Mérimée.

In 1958, Jack Cole and Carl Cole, founders of Coles, sold the U.S. rights to Coles Notes to Cliff Hillegass who then published the books under CliffsNotes.

By 1960, Coles notes sales had peaked. They had published over 120 titles, mostly on English novels; however, they also covered other subjects including maths, science, and foreign languages. Coles Notes is currently owned by Indigo Books in Canada.

See also
 BookRags
 CliffsNotes
 Shmoop
 SparkNotes
 York Notes

Notes

References
I know that name!: the people behind Canada's best-known brand names from Elizabeth Arden to Walter Zeller, Mark Kearney and Randy Ray. Toronto: Dundurn Press, 2002. p. 64 (Googlebooks)
 Partial history of Coles Notes at the archived version of the Cliffs Notes website
The Great Canadian Trivia Book 2, Mark Kearney and Randy Ray. Toronto: Hounslow Press, 1998. p. 214 (Googlebooks)

External links
 Image of Coles Notes title on Margaret Laurence's The Stone Angel and Other Works at The Canadian Design Resource website

Book series introduced in 1948
Study guides
Education in Canada
Indigo Books and Music
Canadian non-fiction books